Webmaster (original title Skyggen, also known as The Shadow) is a 1998 Danish cyberpunk thriller film.

Directed by Thomas Borch Nielsen, it stars Danish actor Lars Bom as the cerebral, machine-like hacker-turned-webmaster J.B., who performs his job while hanging upside down, wearing virtual reality goggles, his mind busy deep inside cyberspace. Upon witnessing a murder, he teams up with the impulsive, energetic Miauv (Puk Scharbau).

The film furthermore won a Silver Grand Prize at the 1999 Brussels International Festival of Fantasy Film, and a Danish Robert Award for Best Production Design.

The movie was financed by the Danish bank "Forstædernes Bank" and the final production cost was not disclosed by neither producers nor the director. When the movie was released in Denmark in 1998 it was met with mixed reviews.

References

External links 
 
 Skyggen at the Danish National Filmography
 Zeitgeist (production company)

1990s science fiction films
1998 films
Cyberpunk films
Danish science fiction films
1990s Danish-language films